Mark Andrew Menzies (born 18 May 1971) is a British Conservative Party politician who has been the Member of Parliament (MP) for Fylde in Lancashire since 2010. He was formerly PPS to Charles Hendry MP, Minister of State for Energy and Climate Change before both men were moved in the 2012 Cabinet Reshuffle. He resigned as Parliamentary Private Secretary (PPS) to Alan Duncan MP, International Development Minister, in March 2014.

Early life
Menzies grew up in Ardrossan, Ayrshire, raised by his mother after his Merchant Navy father died a month before he was born. With his mother working shifts at the local ICI factory to support them, he attended a local primary school before benefiting from the Assisted Places Scheme at a nearby independent secondary school, the Keil School. At the University of Glasgow, he was President of the Conservative Association, in 1994 and graduated from the university with an honours degree in economic and social history. Menzies' professional career was spent in the retail sector. He joined Marks & Spencer as a graduate trainee in 1994 and has later worked in marketing for two large UK supermarkets. In 2007, he was the recipient of the IGD/Unilever Social Innovation Marketing award.

Menzies stood as a Conservative candidate for the safe Labour seat of Glasgow Govan in the 2001 general election, where he came fourth. In 2005, he stood in Selby in Yorkshire, a Labour marginal, and came second, losing by less than 500 votes. He was added to David Cameron's "A-List" in 2006 and Menzies was selected for Fylde in November 2008.

Parliamentary career
He was elected as the MP for Fylde in Lancashire at the 2010 general election, succeeding Michael Jack and retaining the seat for the Conservatives, gaining 22,826 votes (52.2%) and 13,185 majority. After his election in May 2010, Menzies made his maiden speech on 21 June 2010. In November 2010, he was one of only seven newly elected MPs to be chosen as a Parliamentary Private Secretary to a Minister of the Government.

Menzies has been involved in the advocacy of several issues in relation to his Fylde constituency. In the autumn of 2011, he successfully called upon the Government to establish an Enterprise Zone at Warton which he believed would attract international investment and mitigate the compulsory redundancies announced at BAE Systems. Similarly, he has also praised BAE Warton as being a centre of excellence in nine different practice areas and acknowledges the contribution that the company makes to the local economy.

In October and November 2011, reports emerged of dangerous cockling practices in the Ribble Estuary. Menzies raised Governmental awareness of this issue and called for urgent action to avoid a repeat of the 2004 Morecambe Bay cockling disaster. He succeeded in implementing a temporary ban pending further emergency by-laws.

Menzies campaigned for the liberalisation of Sunday Trading legislation. He brought forward a Bill which sought to allow local authorities to vary Sunday trading restrictions in their jurisdiction contemporaneously to large national events. More specifically, he argued that the retail sector should be able to take advantage of any extra revenues generated by the Olympics in London 2012. In line with Menzies' interest in defence, he is a member of the Armed Forces Parliamentary Scheme. Menzies was a member of the Scottish Affairs Select Committee for a time in 2010 before his appointment as a Parliamentary Private Secretary. His website states that his main political priorities include "UK energy security, changing the planning system to empower local communities and limit inappropriate development and ensuring a vibrant future for the defence industry within the UK".

In March 2014, Menzies resigned as Parliamentary Private Secretary to Alan Duncan, then the International Development Minister, after a report in the Sunday Mirror that Menzies had paid a Brazilian male escort for sex and asked him to supply the illegal drug methedrone. Menzies said a number of the claims were "untrue".

Menzies was opposed to Brexit prior to the 2016 EU membership referendum.

In August 2019 he called for an end to fracking for shale gas in the Fylde, following an earth tremor measuring 2.9MI on the Richter Scale. He said: "Throughout my time as the Member of Parliament for Fylde I have called for stringent and robust regulation of the shale gas industry to ensure the safety of local residents... It is now clear that hydraulic fracturing is not suitable for Fylde or the people of Fylde and I will be writing to Ministers and the Oil and Gas Authority to call for full cessation of the shale gas industry operating on the Fylde Coast."

Menzies was reelected in the December 2019 general election.

In the October 2022 Conservative Party leadership election, Menzies supported Rishi Sunak.

Police investigation
Menzies was questioned by police over allegations he fed alcohol to a dog and had a brawl with a friend in August 2015. The dog had emergency veterinary treatment for "intoxication" and "poisoning". Menzies was not charged and strongly denied any wrongdoing. Menzies said his friend had attacked him and stated the police dropped their investigation into him after he showed them pictures of his friend plying the dog with alcoholic drinks.

2017 general election

2019 general election

References

External links

1971 births
Living people
Alumni of the University of Glasgow
Conservative Party (UK) MPs for English constituencies
LGBT members of the Parliament of the United Kingdom
People educated at Keil School
UK MPs 2010–2015
UK MPs 2015–2017
UK MPs 2017–2019
UK MPs 2019–present
Scottish LGBT politicians
People from Ardrossan
Gay politicians